Csepel SC is a Hungarian sports club based in Csepel, the XXI district of Budapest, which is on an island in the Danube in the south of the city. The club was formed in 1912 as Csepeli Torna Klub ("gymnastics club").

The Csepel SC football department

Csepel SC have won the Hungarian football championship four times. They became champions of the following seasons; 1941/42, 1942/43, 1947/48 and 1958/59.

The football department of the club was dissolved after 2001/02 season. The team then played in the second division. Its homeground is the Béke téri Stadion, which has a capacity of 12.000.

Until its relegation at the end of the 1996/97 season Csepel SC spent 51 season in the first division and remains to-date (2007), eighth in the all-time table of the first division.

Details to the History of Csepel SC
In its only participation in European Champions' Cup (in 1960) Csepel SC was eliminated in the qualification round by Fenerbahçe SK of Istanbul. In 1981 Csepel was runner-up in the Mitropa Cup behind Tatran Presov. The last notable success was fourth place in the national league in 1982/83.

In 2000 the football department of the club was merged with the first team of the second division club III. Kerületi TVE from Óbuda in the III. district in the north of Budapest. The joint team played for the next two seasons under the name of Csepel SC in Csepel. The junior teams remained separated.

At the end of the 2001/02 season the football department of Csepel SC was dissolved. Beginning with the season 2003/04 the former partners from Óbuda resumed senior football under the name of III. Kerületi TUE and commenced activities with many players from former teams and its own youth in the fourth division. In that year the team remained undefeated and was promoted to the third division (NBIII), where it is still playing today (2007/08).

Of importance, currently, are the volleyball, wrestling, and cycling departments of the club. Also the handball and boxing sections are of historic significance.

UEFA Champions League

Record by country of opposition
Correct as of 5 July 2010

 P – Played; W – Won; D – Drawn; L – Lost

Naming history

 1912 – Csepeli TK
 1932 – Csepel FC
 1937 – Weisz-Manfréd FC Csepel
 1944 – Csepel SC
 1947 – Csepeli Mukás TE
 1950 – Csepeli Vasas
 1958 – Csepeli SC
 1993 – Csepel SC-Kordax
 1996 – Csepel SC
 2004 – Csepel FC

The Csepel SC basketball department
The basketball department of Csepel SC had its glory days at the decades of '70s and '80s where it won all its domestic titles and participated almost every year in the European competitions.

Honours
Total Titles: 8

Domestic competitions
Hungarian Championship
Winners (3): 1972, 1973, 1989
Hungarian Cup
Winners (5): 1971, 1974, 1976, 1984, 1985

Important athletes
The club has bred Olympic champions including András Balczó, Tibor Berczelly, Aladár Gerevich, Károly Fatér, and Bertalan Papp.

Laszlo Klauz, Wrestling, 1980s, runner-up at the 1989 world championship (Greco-Roman, super-heavyweight), eight national championships.
György Kolonics, Canoe racing, 1991 – 2007, Two Olympic gold and two bronze in C2 and C1 with György Kozmann and Csaba Horváth, fifteen gold medals at World Championships.
Ferenc Németh, Pentathlon, 1954-1960s, Two gold medals (individual and team) at the 1960 Olympics.
György Pásztor, ice hockey player and Officer of the Order of Merit of the Republic of Hungary

References

 
Football clubs in Budapest
Sport in Budapest
1912 establishments in Hungary
Association football clubs established in 1912